New York's 10th State Assembly district is one of the 150 districts in the New York State Assembly. It has been represented by Democrat Steve Stern since 2018, succeeding Chad Lupinacci.

Geography
District 10 is in Suffolk County. It contains Lloyd Harbor, Huntington Bay, Cold Spring Harbor, Huntington, Greenlawn, Huntington Station, Elwood, South Huntington, West Hills, Melville and Dix Hills.

Recent election results

2022

2020

2018

2018 special

2016

2014

2012

References 

10
Suffolk County, New York